This article details the qualifying phase for artistic swimming at the 2024 Summer Olympics. The competition at these Games will comprise a total of 96 artistic swimmers coming from their respective NOCs; each is allowed to enter a maximum of eight members (including two men) if qualified for the mixed team, and a maximum of two artistic swimmers competing in the women's duet. NOCs may select two of the qualified team members to compete in the women's duet. Host nation France reserves an eight-member team across all events as Europe's continental representative.

For the team event, the highest-ranked NOC in each of the five continental meets, except for the host nation France (representing Europe), will obtain a quota place, while the remaining NOCs will compete for the five available spots at the 2024 FINA World Championships. For the duet, the highest-ranked NOC from each of the five continental meets that do not have a qualified team assures a coveted spot, with the remaining NOCs vying for the three remaining spots through the 2024 Worlds. All ten NOCs eligible to compete in the team event must select two members to form a duet.

Timeline

Qualification summary

Mixed team

Women's duet

References

qual
Qualification for the 2024 Summer Olympics
2023 in synchronized swimming
2024 in synchronized swimming